Kunjo  is a village development committee in Mustang District in the Dhawalagiri Zone of northern Nepal. At the time of the 2011 Nepal census it had a population of 711 people living in 174 individual households. The split per gender was approximately 52,6% male population and 47,4% female population.

References

External links
UN map of the municipalities of Mustang District

Populated places in Mustang District